Priory School is a co-educational independent school in Whippingham, Isle of Wight.

History
The school was founded by Elizabeth Joan Goldthorpe in 1993 out of the closure of Upper Chine School with 14 primary aged pupils based in Shanklin. Later the position of headteacher was taken over by her daughter, Katherine, due to Goldthorpe becoming unwell.  The school continued to offer education up to GCSE level. In 2009, the school was sold to parent Edmund Matyjaszek.  He expanded the school to A Levels in 2010.

The school received a Good Schools Guide Award for boys at an English Independent School taking biology GCSE in 2010. In 2015 it received a further Good Schools Guide Award for teaching additional science at GCSE to boys.

In April 2012 a teacher was suspended and investigated in reference to alterations to exam scripts without pupil knowledge. After a ban on dealing with exams and invigilating, the teacher returned in a teaching position in September.

The 2012 pass rates for the school were 100% 5+ A*-C for year 11 with 81% A*-B and 100% A*-C for 11 subjects, maths, further maths, statistics, science, biology, chemistry, physics, history, religious studies, ICT and art. For A Level, the school had 94% pass rate with 69% A* to C and 50% A* to A. The school achieved 100% pass rates at GCSE & A Level in 2016 & 2017.

Princess Beatrice visited the school on 16 June 2014 to unveil a plaque to commemorate 150 years of continuous education on the Whippingham site.

In September 2017, to reflect the Christian ethos, the school name was extended to Priory School of Our Lady of Walsingham with approval of the
Bishop of Portsmouth, Ordinariate of Our Lady of Walsingham and Custodian of the Basilica at Walsingham.

In the Department of Education League Tables, published in February 2018, Priory School was ranked best on the Isle of Wight for A Levels, best on the Isle of Wight for GCSE English and maths, and ranked 21st out of 4417 secondary schools in England for A Levels.

In May 2018 the school was rated as good with outstanding features in its latest Ofsted inspection.

Location
Originally located in the Broadway, Sandown, the school moved to temporary accommodation at Landguard Manor, Shanklin before relocating to Alverstone Manor, also in Shanklin, in 2005. After an initial rejection to this new location, temporary planning permission for 2 years was given to the school in 2005, with the time limit subsequently removed in 2007.

Having sought a new building since coming under new ownership, the school purchased and moved into the former Whippingham Primary School, built by Queen Victoria in 1864 to the design of Prince Albert, in February 2012.

References

External links
 Priory School website

Private schools on the Isle of Wight
Educational institutions established in 1993
1993 establishments in England